Maryland Route 669 (MD 669) is a state highway in the U.S. state of Maryland.  Known as Springs Road, the state highway runs  from U.S. Route 40 Alternate (US 40 Alternate) in Grantsville north to the Pennsylvania state line, where the highway continues as Pennsylvania Route 669 (PA 669).  MD 669 was constructed in the early 1930s as MD 417 and renumbered in the early 1960s to match its Pennsylvania counterpart.

Route description

MD 669 begins at US 40 Alternate (Main Street) in Grantsville.  The state highway heads north as a two-lane undivided road, leaving the town limits of Grantsville and passing scattered residences and farmland.  MD 669 reaches its northern terminus at the Pennsylvania state line, where Springs Road continues north toward Springs and Salisbury as PA 669.

History
Springs Road was constructed as a modern highway starting in 1930.  The state highway was completed by 1933 and marked as MD 417 in 1935.  The Pennsylvania Department of Highways designated the adjacent portion of Springs Road part of PA 669 in 1963. The Maryland State Roads Commission renumbered MD 417 to match the Pennsylvania number the same year.

Junction list

See also

References

External links

 MDRoads: MD 669

669
Maryland Route 669